Antarctopelta (meaning 'Antarctic shield') was a genus of ankylosaurian dinosaur with one known species, A. oliveroi, which lived in Antarctica during the Late Cretaceous Period. It was a medium-sized ankylosaur, reaching  in length or more, and showed characteristics of two different families, making more precise classification difficult. The single known fossil specimen was discovered on James Ross Island in 1986, constituting the first dinosaur remains ever discovered on Antarctica, although it is the second dinosaur from the continent to be formally named.

Discovery and naming

The holotype (specimen used as the basis for the taxon) is the only known example of this genus and species, and was the first dinosaur ever found in Antarctica. It consists of three isolated teeth, part of the lower jaw with another tooth in situ, some other skull fragments, vertebrae (neck, back, hips and tail), some partial limb bones (scapula, ilium and femur), toe bones (five metapodials and two phalanges), and numerous pieces of armor, representing approximately 15% of the skeleton. This specimen was initially located in January 1986 on James Ross Island, off the Antarctic Peninsula. It was discovered by Argentine geologists Eduardo Olivero and Roberto Scasso, but excavation was not completed for almost a decade due to the frozen ground and harsh weather conditions. Much of the skeleton is in poor condition, as many of the bones nearest to the surface were subjected to years of fragmentation by freeze-thaw weathering.

Although the material had been known for decades and written about in three separate publications, Antarctopelta oliveroi was not named until 2006, by Argentine paleontologists Leonardo Salgado and Zulma Gasparini. It was therefore the second named genus of dinosaur from Antarctica after Cryolophosaurus in 1993, despite being discovered first. The genus name refers to its location on the continent of Antarctica and its armored nature. Antarctica is derived from the Greek words αντ/ant- ('opposite of') and αρκτος/arktos ('bear' referring to the constellation Ursa Major, which points north). The Greek πελτη/pelte ('shield') is commonly used to name genera of ankylosaurs (Cedarpelta and Sauropelta, for example). The single known species, A. oliveroi, is named after Eduardo Olivero, who discovered the holotype, first mentioned it in print, and has worked in Antarctica for decades.

Earlier work suggested that the James Ross Island ankylosaur was a juvenile. More recent research indicates that the different parts of the vertebrae are completely fused together, while a juvenile would be expected to have visible sutures between the neural arch and body (centrum) of the vertebrae. A preliminary histological analysis of several bones also indicates a level of remodeling that would not be seen in newly formed bone.

Description

Like other ankylosaurs, Antarctopelta oliveroi was a stocky, herbivorous quadruped protected by armor plates embedded in the skin. Very little of the skull is known, but all of the known skull fragments were heavily ossified for protection. One bone in particular, identified as a supraorbital, included a short spike which would have projected outwards over the eye. The leaf-shaped teeth are asymmetrical, with the majority of the denticles on the edge closest to the tip of the snout.

Six different types of osteoderms were found along with the skeletal remains of Antarctopelta, but very few were articulated with the skeleton, so their placement on the body is largely speculative. They included the base of what would have been a large spike. Flat oblong plates resembled the ones that guarded the neck of the nodosaurid Edmontonia rugosidens. Large circular plates were found associated with smaller, polygonal nodules, perhaps forming a shield over the hips as seen in Sauropelta. Another type of osteoderm was oval-shaped with a keel running down the middle. A few examples of this fifth type were found ossified to the ribs, suggesting that they ran in rows along the flanks of the animal, a very typical pattern among ankylosaurs. The final group consisted mainly of small bony nodules which are often called ossicles, and were probably scattered throughout the body. Several ribs were also found with these ossicles attached.

Vertebrae from sections of the tail were found. Although the tip of the tail did not fossilize, some of the smaller vertebrae recovered would have been situated near the end of the tail in life, and these were associated with ossified tendons on the upper and lower sides. In ankylosaurids, these tendons help to stiffen the end of the tail in support of a large, bony tail club. However, large osteoderms and specialized tail vertebra indicate that Antarctopelta may have in fact had a flat, frond-like tail structure resembling a macuahuitl, akin to that of Stegouros, its closest relative.

Classification
Antarctopelta shares several features with the nodosaurids, mainly in the teeth and armor, while the possibly-clubbed tail is far more similar to those of ankylosaurids. This mosaic of characters makes assignment to a specific family difficult. It had been designated as Ankylosauria incertae sedis before being subjected to a phylogenetic analysis. Later, a phylogenetic analysis performed by Thompson et al., 2011 suggested that Antarctopelta was the basalmost known nodosaurid. However, a 2021 study found Antarctopelta to belong to a distinctive basal lineage of Southern Hemisphere ankylosaurs, the Parankylosauria.

The following cladogram is reproduced from the phylogenetic analysis in the 2021 study by Sergio Soto-Acuña and colleagues:

Paleoecology

This member was deposited in a shallow marine environment and also preserves marine fossils such as shark teeth, remains of the mosasaur Taniwhasaurus, ammonites, bivalves, and gastropods. Index fossils like ammonites suggest the rocks were deposited in the early Maastrichtian stage of the Late Cretaceous Period, or about 71.2–70.8 Ma (million years ago). Despite being found in marine sediment, Antarctopelta, like all ankylosaurs, lived on land. Other ankylosaurs have also been found in marine sediments, likely as a result of carcasses washing out to sea.

Although Antarctica in the Cretaceous was in the southern polar region, the Earth had a much warmer climate during this time period, and the continent would have been ice-free. Animals like Antarctopelta oliveroi would have lived in forests of conifers and even deciduous trees. Despite the higher temperatures, darkness would still have descended for the winter, just as it does today at high latitudes. The Antarctic Peninsula, including James Ross Island, was connected to South America throughout this time period, allowing interchange of fauna between both continents. In fact, the recent discovery of the Chilean Parankylosaurian Stegouros shows that these dinosaurs inhabited also South America.

See also

 Timeline of ankylosaur research
 South Polar dinosaurs

References

Ankylosaurs
Dinosaurs of Antarctica
Late Cretaceous dinosaurs
Maastrichtian life
Fossil taxa described in 2006
James Ross Island
Ornithischian genera